The men's 20 kilometres race walk at the 1958 European Athletics Championships was held in Stockholm, Sweden, on 19 August 1958.

Medalists

Results

Final
19 August

Participation
According to an unofficial count, 14 athletes from 8 countries participated in the event.

 (2)
 (1)
 (1)
 (2)
 (2)
 (2)
 (2)
 (2)

References

20 kilometres race walk
Racewalking at the European Athletics Championships